Tomás (Tomas) Furlong (1886–1952) was an American artist and teacher.

Biography
Furlong was a member of the executive Board of Control of the Art Students League and beginning in 1927 an art instructor at New York University. He was married to Wilhelmina Weber Furlong. In the American modern art movement, his significant circle of friends and acquaintances included John Graham,
Wilem de Kooning, David Smith,
Dorothy Dehner,
Jean Charolot, Alexander Calder, Rockwell and Sally Kent, Thomas Hart Benton, Allen Tucker, Max Weber, Kimon Nicolaidies, and many others. Tomás  Furlong lived and worked in New York, City and shared a gallery with his wife Wilhelmina Weber Furlong. He was a realist and an accomplished muralist.

References

External links
 Detailed description of the Max Weber papers, 1902–2008 ...
 Detailed description of the Dorothy Dehner papers, 1920 ...
 Detailed description of the Ben Benn papers, 1905–1993 ...
 Oral history interviews with Dorothy Dehner, 1965 Oct.-1966 ...
 The Weber Furlong Foundation

American realist painters
American still life painters
Cubist artists
1886 births
1952 deaths
American art educators
Art Students League of New York people
Art Students League of New York alumni
Painters from New York City
People from Bolton Landing, New York
20th-century American painters
American male painters
20th-century American male artists